Vachendorf is a municipality  in the district of Traunstein in Bavaria, Germany.

Districts 
The municipality of Vachendorf has 17 districts.:

References

Traunstein (district)